Juan Martínez Brito (born May 17, 1958 in Guanabacoa, Havana) is a retired discus thrower from Cuba, who represented his native country at the 1992 Summer Olympics.

He was the winner at the AAA Championships in 1985.

International competitions

References

 

1958 births
Living people
Athletes from Havana
Cuban male discus throwers
Olympic athletes of Cuba
Athletes (track and field) at the 1992 Summer Olympics
Pan American Games medalists in athletics (track and field)
Athletes (track and field) at the 1983 Pan American Games
Athletes (track and field) at the 1987 Pan American Games
Athletes (track and field) at the 1991 Pan American Games
World Athletics Championships athletes for Cuba
Pan American Games bronze medalists for Cuba
Universiade medalists in athletics (track and field)
Central American and Caribbean Games silver medalists for Cuba
Competitors at the 1982 Central American and Caribbean Games
Competitors at the 1986 Central American and Caribbean Games
Universiade bronze medalists for Cuba
Central American and Caribbean Games medalists in athletics
Medalists at the 1983 Pan American Games
Medalists at the 1991 Pan American Games
Friendship Games medalists in athletics
20th-century Cuban people
21st-century Cuban people